Smicrideinae is one of five subfamilies in the family Hydropsychidae of net-spinning caddisflies.

References 

Trichoptera subfamilies